Acleris inana is a species of moth of the family Tortricidae. It is found in North America, where it has been recorded from Alberta, Kentucky, Maine, Missouri and Ontario.

The wingspan is about 19 mm. Adults are very similar to Acleris robinsoniana, but with less
prominent pure white scaling on the rear portion of the thorax and with the basal area of the forewing rather evenly dull grey-brown without contrasting white scaling or obscuring blackish shading frequently found in robinsoniana forms. Adults have been recorded on wing in February and from August to September.

The larvae feed on Alnus, Betula and Corylus species.

References

Moths described in 1869
inana
Moths of North America